Rengo is a city and commune located in the Zona Central of Chile, situated in the Cachapoal Province of the O'Higgins Region at a distance of  south of the city of Rancagua and  south of the national capital Santiago. It was named after the courageous Toqui Rengo for his particular bravery at the Battle of Lagunillas.

Demographics
Of these, 37,075 (72.9%) lived in urban areas and 13,755 (27.1%) in rural areas. The population grew by 16.5% (7,213 persons) between the 1992 and 2002 censuses.

Administration
As a commune, Rengo is a third-level administrative division of Chile administered by a municipal council, headed by an alcalde who is directly elected every four years.

Within the electoral divisions of Chile, Rengo is represented in the Chamber of Deputies by Felipe Letelier (PPD) and Ricardo Rincón  (PDC) as part of the 33rd electoral district, together with Mostazal, Graneros, Codegua, Machalí, Requínoa, Olivar, Doñihue, Coinco, Coltauco, Quinta de Tilcoco and Malloa. The commune is represented in the Senate by Alejandro Garcia-Huidobro (UDI) and Juan Pablo Letelier Morel (PS) as part of the 9th senatorial constituency (O'Higgins Region).

Notable people
 

Patricio Pérez Díaz (born 1980), Chilean footballer

References

Communes of Chile
Populated places in Cachapoal Province